Pope Maximus of Alexandria, 15th Pope and Patriarch of Alexandria. 
He is commemorated in the Coptic Synaxarion on the 14th day of Baramudah (April 22), and by the Romans on Dec. 27.

References 
General
 Anba Maximus The Fifteenth Pope of Alexandria.

Specific

External links 
 The Official website of the Coptic Orthodox Pope of Alexandria and Patriarch of All Africa on the Holy See of Saint Mark the Apostle
 Coptic Documents in French

Saints from Roman Egypt
3rd-century Popes and Patriarchs of Alexandria
3rd-century Christian saints
282 deaths